Atterberry  may refer to:

People
Atterberry (surname)

Places
Atterberry, Illinois, United States
Atterberry No. 10 Precinct, Menard County, Illinois, United States